Tom Wiggin (born July 6, 1955) is an American actor, writer and entrepreneur. He is best known for creating the role of nefarious businessman Kirk Anderson on the long-running soap opera As the World Turns.

Early life, family and education
Wiggin was born in New York City and raised in Alexandria, Virginia. He began acting in community theater at age eight. 

He graduated from St. Paul's School in Concord, New Hampshire, where he continued to act while playing three varsity sports. 

He attended Columbia University in New York for three semesters, then left to pursue his acting career.

Career
Wiggin has acted professionally on stage, TV and in films. He has also written for two soap operas (Another World and As the World Turns) and had one screenplay optioned (Gift of the Robin's Nest). 

Wiggin started his career in New York City. He landed the role of Danny Zuko in a national tour of Grease and eventually joined the Broadway cast. He left Grease to star in an Off Broadway production of the British play 'Class Enemy' during which he was cast as Mike, the ex-quarterback cutter, in the TV series Breaking Away. Wiggin went on to contract roles on two soap operas, Texas (Joe Foster) and Another World (Gil Fenton), acting with Morgan Freeman and Joe Morton. Between these two contracts, he joined the cast of the Broadway comedy Breakfast with Les and Bess. In the mid eighties, Wiggin joined the cast of the Off Broadway smash The Foreigner (Owen) and played Agent foster in the TV movie Izzy and Moe, starring Jackie Gleason and Art Carney.

After moving to Los Angeles, Wiggin guest-starred in episodes of Hotel and St. Elsewhere, in addition to starring in the west coast premiere of the Australian play 'Down an Alley Filled with Cats' at the Pasadena Playhouse. He returned to New York in 1988 when he was cast in As the World Turns. He played Kirk Anderson for 10 years. In 1994 he appeared with Sam Waterston in the Lincoln Center production of Abe Lincoln in Illinois. Later he guest starred in an episode of Law & Order. He had non-contract roles on All My Children (Stan), and Guiding Light (Sam). He played Warden Whitakker in Iron Jawed Angels starring Hilary Swank, Whitey Ford in the mini series The Bronx Is Burning, starring John Turturro and he appeared again on Broadway, starring with Farrah Fawcett in Bobbi Boland, but the show closed in previews. He played Lawrence Decker, a non-contract role on Guiding Light shortly before it went dark.

He has appeared in several independent films, 'Exposure', Brother to Brother (starring Anthony Mackie) and Diggers, starring Paul Rudd and Maura Tierney.

In 2015 he guest starred on Person of Interest. In 2016, he appeared at Arena Stage in Washington DC in "City of Conversation" and "All the Way". He will return to Arena Stage in January 2018 in "The Great Society".

Awards and nominations
He has been nominated for two Soap Opera Digest awards. In 1990, he was nominated for Outstanding Comic Actor for As the World Turns. He was nominated again in 1996 for Outstanding Male Scene Stealer (for As the World Turns).

Personal life 
He and his first wife, Amy Forte Wiggin, are divorced. They have two daughters. He remarried in 2010 to Jennifer Dumas, a New York theater producer.

Filmography

Film

Television

References

External links

Interview with Tom Wiggin at peteranthonyholder.com

Living people
1955 births
American soap opera writers
American male television actors
American male film actors
Male actors from New York City
Screenwriters from New York (state)
American male television writers